Neil William Garguilo (born April 14, 1982) is an American writer, producer, director, actor and improv comedian. Garguilo is co-creator, showrunner and star of the Syfy original animated series Hell Den which is amongst the first series to appear on Syfy's TZGZ late-night block. He also appeared on all five seasons of the MTV hit comedy series Awkward, and regularly works with Funny or Die and members of the comedy group Broken Lizard.

He is the founding member of the celebrated improv comedy group Dr. God, the group responsible for the 2015 horror-comedy Bloodsucking Bastards.

In 2020, Garguilo won a Daytime Emmy Award for his Funny or Die series Brainwashed By Toons. He was nominated twice for the series and shares an Emmy Award with Seinfeld star Jason Alexander.

Early life
Garguilo was born in New Brunswick, New Jersey. He attended Spotswood High School and is a graduate of Pace University. While in college, he also attended the New York Film Academy and performed stand-up comedy regularly at the New York Comedy Club.

Career
After college, Garguilo attended the Lee Strasberg Theater Institute and studied improv comedy at Upright Citizens Brigade (New York and Los Angeles), iO West, Second City Hollywood and the Pack Theater.

His television career started at TV Guide Network as an assistant on the John Henson television series Watch This. From there, Garguilo would work on and off camera for years before landing the role of Principal Cox on the hit MTV series Awkward.

In 2014, he created his first television series MOCKpocalpyse which aired for three seasons on the Mark Cuban-owned cable network AXS TV. This talking-head comedy series featured comics such as Steve Agee, Nate Bargatze, Mary Birdsong, Frangela, Kevin Heffernan, Dave Holmes, Jamie Kaler, Michael Kosta, Steve Lemme, Jimmy Pardo, Emo Philips, Catherine Reitman, Sam Richardson, Brody Stevens, Ryan Stout and more.

In 2019, Garguilo launched his production company Rafael Raffaele Entertainment. Through his company, Garguilo created his first animated television series Hell Den alongside the members of his comedy group Dr. God. He serves as showrunner, director and stars as Andrew in addition to playing dozens of sketch characters.

Also, through his company, Garguilo created, directed, wrote and produced his 2019 Funny or Die digital series Brainwashed by Toons, featuring songs with Jason Alexander, Wayne Brady and Lea Thompson. He made the series with longtime collaborators Dwayne Colbert and Gregory James Jenkins. For his work, he won Outstanding Original Song and was nominated for Outstanding Writing for a Special Class Series at the 47th Annual Daytime Emmy Awards.

Personal life
Garguilo is of Puerto Rican and Italian descent.

In 2019, he was engaged to voice actress and producer Kristin Sanchez.

Filmography

Television

Film

Digital

Awards and nominations

References

External links
 
 Neil Garguilo at the iO Theater.
 Neil Garguilo at the Ruby LA.

1982 births
21st-century American comedians
American comedy writers
American male comedians
American male screenwriters
American television writers
American male voice actors
Pace University alumni
Living people
People from New Brunswick, New Jersey
American male television writers
Daytime Emmy Award winners
Showrunners
Writers from New Jersey
Screenwriters from New Jersey
21st-century American screenwriters
21st-century American male writers